We Don't Belong Here is Violent Soho's debut studio album, released on 7 June 2008 on the Magic Dirt imprint, Emergency Music. Many of the tracks on the album were remastered and re-written for Violent Soho's self-titled album, which is considered by many to be the band's first proper album.

Track listing

Personnel
 Produced by Dean Dirt
 Additional production on tracks 5 and 7 by Bryce Moorhead
 Tracks 1, 4-8 recorded and mixed with Bryce Moorhead at Zero Interference Studios, Brisbane.
 Tracks 2, 3, 9, and 10 recorded and mixed with Sloth at HeadGap Studios, Melbourne.
 Mastered by Lindsay Gravina at Birdland Studios, Melbourne.
 Artwork by Luke Boerdam
 Photography by Brad Hymie

References

Violent Soho albums
2008 albums